Heterorhabdidae is a family of copepods belonging to the order Calanoida.

Genera:
 Disseta Giesbrecht, 1889
 Hemirhabdus Wolfenden, 1911
 Heterohabdus
 Heterorhabdus Giesbrecht, 1898
 Heterostylites Sars, 1920
 Mesorhabdus Sars, 1905
 Microdisseta Heptner, 1972
 Neorhabdus Heptner, 1972
 Paraheterorhabdus Brodsky, 1950

References

Copepods